The Place to Be may refer to:
 The Place to Be (Junior Cook album)
 The Place to Be (Benny Green album)
 "Place to Be", a song from the 1972 album Pink Moon by Nick Drake
 "The Place To Be", a song from the 2022 album Maintain by downset.